Alfons Dresen (born 24 July 1931) is a Belgian footballer. He played in four matches for the Belgium national football team in 1955 and 1956.

References

External links
 
 

1931 births
Living people
Belgian footballers
Belgium international footballers
Association football goalkeepers
Lierse S.K. players
K. Waterschei S.V. Thor Genk players
K. Lyra players
People from Lier, Belgium